Glenarm Upper is a barony in County Antrim, Northern Ireland. To its east runs the east-Antrim coast, and it is bordered by four other baronies: Glenarm Lower to the north; Antrim Lower to the west; Antrim Upper to the south-west; and Belfast Lower to the south. Chaine Tower, situated at the entrance to Larne Lough, is located within Glenarm Upper.

List of settlements
Below is a list of settlements in Glenarm Upper:

Towns
Larne (Glenarm Upper portion)

Villages and population centres
Ballygalley
Craigy Hill
Kilwaughter
Millbrook
West End

List of civil parishes
Below is a list of civil parishes in Glenarm Upper:
Carncastle
Kilwaughter
Larne

References

 
Clandeboye